Linear arithmetic synthesis, or LA synthesis, is a means of sound synthesis invented by the Roland Corporation when they released their D-50 synthesizer in 1987.

Overview 

LA synthesis combines traditional subtractive synthesis with PCM-based samples.

The term linear arithmetic refers to synthesis that puts sounds together in a timeline. Typically a PCM transient begins a note, which is then continued with a subtractive synthesis prolongation. Roland did not use the term additive, as additive synthesis already refers to a different synthesis method.

This technology first appeared in 1987, in the Roland D-50 synthesizer. At the time, re-synthesizing samplers were very expensive, so Roland set out to produce a machine that would be easy to program, sound realistic, and still sound like a synthesizer. Also, Yamaha had previously gained world market lead with their DX7 FM synth, which excelled at metallic, percussive sounds—something that Roland's synths using subtractive synthesis were less good at.

Roland understood that their subtractive synthesis method had to change.  One of the more complex parts of a sound to program is the attack transient, so Roland added a suite of sampled attack transients to subtractive synthesis. As well as the attack transients, Roland added a suite of single-cycle sampled waveforms that could be continuously looped. Sounds could now have three components: An attack, a body made from a subtractive synth sound (saw or pulse wave through a filter) and an "embellishment" of one of many looped samples. (The looped samples also contained a collection of totally synthetic waves derived from additive synthesis, as well as sequences of inharmonic wave cycles. Thus, LA synthesis offered the realistic sounds of a sampler with the control and creativity of a synthesizer.)

The PCM waveforms could be modified with a pitch envelope and a time-variant amplifier. Waveforms from the sound wave generators could be further modified with time-variant filters for cutoff frequency and resonance.  These modified waveforms were called "partials".

Two partials grouped together created a tone. Tones could be modified using up to three low-frequency oscillators, a pitch envelope, a programmable equalizer, and on-board effects such as reverberation and chorus. Two tones grouped together created a patch.

Hardware
 Roland CM-32L
 Roland CM-32LN
 Roland CM-64
 Roland CM-500
 Roland D-05
 Roland D-10
 Roland D-110
 Roland D-20
 Roland D-50
 Roland D-550
 Roland E-10
 Roland E-15
 Roland E-20
 Roland E-30
 Roland LAPC-I
 Roland LAPC-N
 Roland MT-32
 Roland MT-100
 Roland RA-50

Similar concepts
Yamaha's SY77, its rack-mount equivalent TG77, and successor SY99 introduced Advanced Wave Memory 2 (AWM2), enabling playback and digital filtering of samples. Notably, these also let AWM2 samples be used as transients to Advanced FM (AFM) synth sounds, as looped oscillators in their own right, or even as modulators of AFM carriers. This, like LA, enabled more realistic modeling of physical instruments, and in combination with FM, new possibilities for synthesis. The SY99 seemed to be the last FM workstation by Yamaha, and the later FM synth FS1R did not feature AWM — so SY99 was seemingly the last synth in which AWM and FM could be combined. This was until the Montage in 2016, which combines a later version of AWM2 with FM-X (an offshoot of the FM engine from FS1R, without the latter's Formant Synthesis) - though without letting samples be used as modulators, as the 77/99 series did. In any case, AWM sampling on its own has become a mainstay of subsequent flagship Yamaha products, such as the Yamaha EX5, Motif, and Montage lines — which still use the umbrella term AWM2, though the engine's details have changed many times.

Casio has also developed a similar synthesis system known as Advanced and High Quality Large Waveform, better known as AHL, for use on their portable keyboard line.
Earlier Casio keyboard models instead use ZPI, a similar but more advanced system. AHL was originally a simplified version of the previous ZPI, in which both are mostly optimized for acoustic instrument samples.

Ensoniq with the SQ-80 called the same technique Cross Wave Synthesis. Kawai with the K4 called the same technique Digital Multi Spectrum.

References

L